Boro Vučinić (born 1954 in Titograd) is the former head of the Montenegrin National Security Agency, as well as the former Minister of Defense and the former Minister of Urban Planning of Montenegro.

As Minister of Urban Planning Vučinić was involved the sale of an old ship repair yard on the Adriatic Sea, the first major privatization deal of Montenegro since the independence from Serbia.

He has a master's degree and is married with four children.

References

External links

 Biography at the Ministry of Defense

1954 births
Defence ministers of Montenegro
Democratic Party of Socialists of Montenegro politicians
Living people
Politicians from Podgorica
University of Montenegro Faculty of Law alumni